Elections to Barnsley Metropolitan Borough Council were held on 3 May 1996, with one third of the council up for election. The election resulted in Labour retaining control of the council.

Election result

|- style="background-color:#F9F9F9"
! style="background-color: " |
| Militant Labour
| align="right" | 0
| align="right" | 0
| align="right" | 0
| align="right" | 0
| align="right" | 0.0
| align="right" | 1.4
| align="right" | 235
| align="right" | -0.5
|-

This resulted in the following composition of the council:

Ward results

+/- figures represent changes from the last time these wards were contested.

|- style="background-color:#F9F9F9"
! style="background-color: " |
| Militant Labour
|  Souter C. Ms.
| align="right" | 235
| align="right" | 11.6
| align="right" | -4.8
|-

By-elections between 1996 and 1998

References

1996 English local elections
1996
1990s in South Yorkshire